Dénes Pataky (26 June 1916 – 7 April 1987) was a Hungarian figure skater who competed in men's singles.  He was a four-time gold medalist at the Hungarian Figure Skating Championships from 1933 to 1936.  He also won the silver medal at the 1934 European Figure Skating Championships, captured the bronze medal at the 1935 World Figure Skating Championships, and finished ninth at the 1936 Winter Olympics.

Results

References

Dénes Pataky's profile at the Hungarian Olympic Committee

Navigation

1916 births
1987 deaths
Hungarian male single skaters
Olympic figure skaters of Hungary
Figure skaters at the 1936 Winter Olympics
World Figure Skating Championships medalists
European Figure Skating Championships medalists